Michelle Enyeart (born July 26, 1988) is an American soccer player from Hemet, California. She was a forward for the University of Portland women's soccer team and the United States U-20 women's national soccer team.

Career

National Team career
Enyeart was a member of the United States U-20 women's national soccer team from 2006 to 2008, and competed in the 2007 Pan American Games and the 2008 FIFA U-20 Women's World Cup in Chile.

She is currently ranked ninth all-time in goals scored for the U-20 women's national team, with nine international goals. Six of those goals came during the 2008 CONCACAF Women's U-20 Championship in Puebla, Mexico, where she tied with United States teammate Kelley O'Hara as the top scorer of the tournament.

Professional career
Enyeart was drafted 14th overall at the 2010 WPS Draft by the Los Angeles Sol. The Sol ceased operations on January 28, 2010; in the ensuing dispersal draft, Enyeart was picked up by the Boston Breakers. Due to a severe leg injury suffered near the end of her last season with the Portland Pilots, Enyeart was not placed on the Breakers' roster proper, but her rights have been retained by the club.

References

External links
Portland player page

Portland Pilots women's soccer players
People from Hemet, California
Sportspeople from Riverside County, California
1988 births
Living people
Footballers at the 2007 Pan American Games
American women's soccer players
Pan American Games silver medalists for the United States
United States women's under-20 international soccer players
Pan American Games medalists in football
Women's association football forwards
Medalists at the 2007 Pan American Games